The year 1658 in science and technology involved some significant events.

Astronomy
 approx. date – Kamalakara compiles his major work, Siddhāntatattvaviveka, in Varanasi.

Life sciences
 Jan Swammerdam observes red blood cells (in the frog) with the aid of a microscope.
 Samuel Volckertzoon observes a quokka on Rottnest Island.

Mathematics
 Christopher Wren gives the first published proof of the arc length of a cycloid.

Publication
 Posthumous publication of Arzneibüchlein, pharmacopoeia compiled by Anna von Diesbach.

Births
 March 5 – Antoine Laumet de La Mothe, sieur de Cadillac, French explorer (died 1730)
 April 2 - Pierre Pomet, French pharmacist (died 1699)
 April 8 - Georges Mareschal, French surgeon (died 1736)
 unknown date – Nicolas Andry, French physician (died 1742)

Deaths
 January 9 - Pierre-Jean Fabre, French physician and alchemist (born 1588)
 October 22 – Charles Bouvard, French herbalist (born 1572)

References

 
17th century in science
1650s in science